The Egyptian Labour Corps (also known as the ELC or Labour Corps) was a group of Egyptian labourers who worked for the British Army in Egypt during the First World War's Sinai and Palestine Campaign.

Historical context
Egypt had historically been part of the Ottoman Empire for hundreds of years. However, starting in the late nineteenth century, British influence in the country began to expand as the Sultans of Egypt proved increasingly incapable of managing the country's financial affairs and start to borrow heavily from foreign financiers, including British businessmen. Eventually, the British conquered Egypt and established a protectorate over the country, bring Egypt (de facto) into the British Empire. As part of this protectorate, the British promised to defend Egypt from Ottoman, African and European incursions and never to request their aid in future conflicts. However, the British quickly realised that they desperately needed the support of Egyptian labour in a land which was so inhospitable to Europeans, and so started to recruit labourers among the Egyptian populace.

Scope of operations
Companies of the Egyptian Labour Corps were supplied to work on construction of railways and roads. They worked to manage sanitation, were employed as stevedores and on wharf construction. They loaded and unloaded lighters, carried stores for supply depots and loaded lorries for the ASC. They laid the pipelines, built the railway embankments and helped lay the track, loaded and unloaded the trains, manned the surf boats, stowed or discharged the cargoes of surf boats from supply and store ships, and were employed everywhere on conservancy duties.

The corps constructed the duplication of the Zagazig to Ismailia section of the railway from Cairo to the Suez Canal, built metalled roads out into the Sinai desert and laid water pipelines. About  of railway, road and pipelines were laid in a few weeks for the forward defence of the Suez Canal before it was extended eastwards into the Sinai. They also assisted in horse and camel hospitals, and travelled to Akaba to assist Lawrence in his work for the Arab Revolt.

Beside the pipelines and the railway, hundreds of miles of wire netting roads were laid across the sand and pegged down, and great reservoirs, to hold huge quantities of water supplied by filters at a rate of  a day, were constructed. At the beginning of December 1916, the Egyptian Expeditionary Force had a strength of 150,000 British, Australian and New Zealand and 6,000 Indian troops, and 13,000 Egyptian labourers.

Rail was laid at the rate of  a month and the pipeline construction eventually caught up with the railway at El Arish in February 1917. At this time General Harry Chauvel ordered aerial counter-attacks on German and Ottoman positions to stop as retaliation against German aerial attacks on the Egyptian Labour Corps, which stopped the railway gangs from continuing the strategically vital railway on to Rafah.

Under the supervision of administrative officers of corps, divisions and sanitary sections, troops worked alongside the Egyptian Labour Corps in the fight against pests in the Jordan Valley. This involved, among other strategies, draining swamps, and constructing hard horse standings. Near Jericho in 1918 a 600-strong company of the Egyptian Labour Corps worked for two months to suppress mosquitoes breeding in the overflow from the Ain es Sultan spring.

Recruitment
This was carried out by Egyptian agents who visited villages in their sub-district under the direction of a district recruiting officer who was assisted by a medical officer. These two officers inspected and examined all recruits and the agent was paid P.T. 5 for each recruit who passed. Each successful recruit could choose between Camel Transport, Horse Transport, Labour, Remount and Veterinary corps and services. The recruits enlisted for six months and were given an advance of English £3/-/- to provide for dependents. At the Recruiting Depot the recruit was issued with blankets and an overcoat and at the corps or service depot he was disinfected, given clothes and equipment. In the Egyptian Labour Corps the pay was 5 P.T. per day while the other corps and services paid 6 P.T. per day plus clothing and rations.

These men were most often from extremely poor villagers and the daily inducement of 7 piastres (1 shilling and 6 pence) and rations was very attractive to them. When money and food were not enough, military authority under the terms of the protectorate was imposed over all Egyptian officials and civilians. Then the Muidir, Lord Lieutenant or Omdah, mayors of Egyptian towns would organise press gangs and the necessary number of armed guards to watch over the labourers.

It is also probable that members of the Egyptian Labour Corps were 'sealed' like members of the Egyptian Camel Transport Corps by a seal being attached to their wrists. Initially the periods of service appear to have started as quite short term but became very long term as their importance was recognised and the difficulty of finding more recruits increased. By the first half of 1918 riots, blamed on bad recruitment methods employed to find more workers for the Egyptian Labour Corps, began to occur.

Sir Reginald Wingate acknowledged on 8 May, the importance to General Edmund Allenby of keeping the Egyptian Labour Corps and the Egyptian Camel Transport Corps at full strength. At first Wingate contemplated "some form of compulsory service" but such a step would not be supported by the Sultan of Egypt and cause deep resentment throughout the country. A meeting at the Residency, in Cairo, decided that requisitioning labour from the villages through the Mudirs, Mamours and Omdas might prove effective. The meeting felt this corvée system would be supported by the Sultan and his Ministers and could be introduced without causing discontent among the general population.

Organisation

By 1917 the Egyptian Labour Corps had over 55,000 labourers, mainly organized into companies with 12 gangs forming one company. The gang was the working unit consisting of 50 men with a headman, often all belonging to one home village. These men often sang while they worked and this was thought to be an indication that they were happy, but one Egyptian chant sung by the workers was, "Kam Lehloh, Kam Yaum?" which translates as "How many days, how many nights?"

The Egyptian Labour Corps was described in February 1918 as organised into companies of 600 men with a subaltern commanding officer and two junior officers. Three to six of these companies formed a Camp under an officer commanding Egyptian Labour Corps of an Area. The officers were at first drawn from Arabic speaking Anglo-Egyptians and afterwards NCOs and privates were recruited from British units and trained in Arabic. Their level of proficiency was recognised by a special rate of extra duty pay. Supervision was provided by the reis of each gang and by civilian foremen who were paid from English £1/10/- to English £15/-/- per month. These civilian foremen were graded as 'NCO Foremen' provided with a uniform and treated as acting Non-commissioned officers of the ELC.

It was found to be 'practicable and advisable' to recruit different companies from different parts of Egypt and new gangs could be trained in particular types of work required to ensure efficient and rapid handling of stores and materiel.

Acknowledgement
The great value of the service of the Egyptian Labour Corps was acknowledged by Edmund Allenby in his despatch of 16 December 1917 where he mentions the great value and importance of their service, their steadiness under fire and devotion to duty under difficult conditions.

Notes

References

 
 
 
 
 
 
 
 
 
 
 
 
 
 

Middle Eastern theatre of World War I
History of Egypt
History of Egypt (1900–present)
Egypt in World War I
Labour in Egypt
Non-combatant military personnel